Rayon d'Or (1876–1896) was a French Thoroughbred racehorse and Champion sire in the United States. Bred by Frédéric Lagrange at his Haras de Dangu stud farm in Dangu, Eure, he was sired by Flageolet whose wins included the Prix Morny (1872), Goodwood Cup (1873) and Jockey Club Cup (1873) and whom Rayon d'Or would help make the Leading sire in Great Britain and Ireland in 1879. Rayon d'Or's dam was the good producing mare Araucaria, sired by Ambrose. Araucaria was the last foal of the mare Pocahontas whom Thoroughbred Heritage says is "one of the most influential thoroughbreds of all time, male or female."

Rayon d'Or was conditioned for racing by Tom Jennings, Sr., a member of the pioneering English Racing Colony at Chantilly, Oise. Jennings was the trainer of Gladiateur, winner of the British Triple Crown in 1865.

Rayon d'Or raced from age two through four, winning important races in England and France at distances of one mile to mile and a quarter such as the Sussex and Champion Stakes, and at endurance distances such as the 4,000 meter Prix du Cadran at Longchamp Racecourse and the Prix Rainbow at 5,000 meters. Rayon d'Or's most important win came in the Classic St. Leger Stakes.

Stud record
Rayon d'Or was retired to stud at  Haras de Dangu where he sired only a few foals before being sold in the dispersal of the Haras de Dangu horses in November 1882. He was purchased by American businessman, and former member of the United States House of Representatives,  William Scott.  Rayon d'Or was brought to the United States to stand at Scott's Algeria Stock Farm at Erie, Pennsylvania where he sired most of his major winners. In 1889 he became the first French-bred stallion to top the American leading sires list. Scott died in 1892, and the Algeria Stud was dispersed. Rayon d'Or was purchased by August Belmont Jr. who stood him at his Nursery Stud in Kentucky.

Rayon d'Or notably sired:
 Tea Tray (b. 1885) - won Monmouth Handicap (1890)
 Gypsy Queen (b. 1886) - won Spinaway Stakes (1888), Gazelle Stakes (1889)
 Tenny (b. 1886) - won Brooklyn Handicap (1890)
 Chaos (b. 1887) - won the 1889 Futurity Stakes
 Banquet (b. 1887) - on July 18, 1890, he set a new North American record of 2:03.75 for a mile and a quarter on dirt. Won 1891 Monmouth Handicap, 1892 Manhattan Handicap
 Liza (b. 1892) - won Swift Stakes (1894), Travers Stakes (1895)
 Soufflé (b. 1893) - in 1896 she won the Kentucky Oaks, Latonia Oaks, and Jerome Handicap. Named the retrospective American Champion Three-Year-Old Filly
 Don de Oro (b. 1894) - won Tremont Stakes (1896), Kenner Stakes (1897)
 Octagon (b. 1894) - won Toboggan Handicap (1897, 1898), Withers Stakes (1897),  Brooklyn Derby (1897). Sire of U.S. Racing Hall of Fame filly, Beldame.

Through another of his daughters, St Priscilla, Rayon d'Or was also the damsire of the outstanding runner, Stromboli.

Rayon d'Or died at Nursery Stud on July 15, 1896 at age twenty.

References
 Rayon d'Or's pedigree and partial racing stats
 Rayon d'Or at Thoroughbred Heritage

1876 racehorse births
1896 racehorse deaths
Racehorses bred in France
Racehorses trained in France
United States Champion Thoroughbred Sires
Belmont family
Thoroughbred family 3-n
St Leger winners